WRRW-LP was a broadcast radio station formerly licensed to and serving Williamsburg, Virginia. WRRW-LP was owned and operated by The Popular Assembly of New Horizons 300 and His Successors.

The station had previously carried an Adult Album Alternative and Public Radio format.

Frequency change
According to VARTV.com, the FCC has granted a construction permit for WRRW to move to 102.5 FM. "The frequency was previously licensed to Christian Life Center of Williamsburg as WJRX-LP".  With WDYL moving to 100.9 FM, WRRW's signal would have been greatly compromised. The frequency change took place on Friday, February 27, 2009.

The station went silent on December 28, 2012 due to the loss of the "lease at [the] broadcast location."

The Federal Communications Commission cancelled WRRW-LP's license on May 28, 2015, due to the station having been silent for more than twelve months.

References

External links
 

RRW
R
Radio stations established in 2004
Defunct radio stations in the United States
Radio stations disestablished in 2015
2015 disestablishments in Virginia
2004 establishments in Virginia
RRW-LP